Miyajimaguchi Station is a railway station on the Sanyō Main Line in Hatsukaichi, Hiroshima, operated by West Japan Railway Company (JR West). From the pier near the station there are ferry services for Miyajima (Itsukushima) by JR Miyajima Ferry and Miyajima Matsudai Kisen.

Platforms

Connecting lines

JR
█ Sanyō Main Line
Rapid Service
Miyauchikushido Station Miyajimaguchi Station — Ōtake Station
Local
Ajina Station — Miyajimaguchi Station — Maezora Station
JR Miyajima Ferry
Miyajimaguchi Station — Miyajima Station

Hiroden
█ Miyajima Line
Line #2
Hiroden-ajina — Hiroden-miyajima-guchi
Hiroden-ajina — (Kyoteijo-mae (temporary)) — Hiroden-miyajima-guchi
Hiroden-miyajima-guchi Station is located to the south from JR Miyajimaguchi Station, 2 minutes walk from the station.

History
Opened on September 25, 1897 as a station of Sanyo Railway called "Miyajima Station".
Nationalized on December 1, 1906.
Renamed as "Miyajimaguchi Station" on April 1, 1942.
Privatized as JR West on April 1, 1987.

Ekiben
"Anago-meshi", a box lunch, rice with kabayaki of congridae

See also

 List of railway stations in Japan

External links

  

Railway stations in Hiroshima Prefecture
Sanyō Main Line
Hiroshima City Network
Railway stations in Japan opened in 1897